The 2005 Under-18 European Promotion Cup for Men was the fifth edition of the basketball European Promotion Cup for U18 men's teams, today known as FIBA U18 European Championship Division C. It was played in Malta from 25 to 30 July 2005. Andorra men's national under-18 basketball team won the tournament.

Participating teams

First round
In the first round, the teams were drawn into two groups of four. The first two teams from each group will advance to the semifinals, the other teams will play in the 5th–8th place playoffs.

Group A

Group B

5th–8th place playoffs

5th–8th place semifinals

Seventh place match

Fifth place match

Championship playoffs

Semifinals

Third place match

Final

Final standings

References

FIBA U18 European Championship Division C
2005–06 in European basketball
FIBA U18
International basketball competitions hosted by Malta
FIBA